G101 may refer to :
 China National Highway 101, a major trunk route in China
 R-1820-G101, a model of the Wright R-1820 aircraft engine
 the former on-air moniker of WFGE, a radio station licensed to State College, Pennsylvania, USA

G-101 may refer to :
 Gibson G-101, a model of combo organ

G 101 may refer to :
 G 101 (glider), a designation for a Swedish military glider in use from 1942 to 1953